The Docheiariou monastery is an Eastern Orthodox monastery at the monastic state of Mount Athos in Greece.

The  is located in the monastery complex.

History
It was founded during the late 10th or early 11th century, and is dedicated to the memory of the Archangels Michael and Gabriel. It celebrates its patronal feastday on November 8 (21, Gregorian style).

By the end of the 15th century according to the Russian pilgrim Isaiah, the monastery was Serb.

In 1979, Docheiariou became a cenobitic monastery when Elder Gregorios (d. 22 October 2018) arrived at Docheiariou from Missolonghi with a group of ten monks.

The monastery also houses the icon of the Virgin "Gorgoepikoos" or "She who is Quick to Hear [Prayers]". The monastery ranks tenth in the hierarchy of the Athonite monasteries. The library holds 545 manuscripts, 62 of which are on parchment, and more than 5,000 printed books. In 2011 Docheiariou had 53 monks.

References

External links

 Dochiariou monastery at the Mount Athos website 
 Greek Ministry of Culture: Holy Monastery of Docheiariou

Christian monasteries established in the 10th century
Monasteries on Mount Athos
Greek Orthodox monasteries
Byzantine monasteries in Greece